Dickenson Hill Road (Chinese: 狄更生山路) is a one-way road located in Chinatown within the Outram Planning Area in Singapore. The road links Banda Street to Neil Road and ran next to  Jinricksha Station.

Etymology and history
Dickenson Hill was named after Reverend J.T. Dickenson who ran a missionary school in the area and Dickenson Hill Road was named after it. The area was eventually renamed as Bukit Pasoh but it retained its name.

References

Roads in Singapore
Outram, Singapore
Chinatown, Singapore